San Francisco Municipality may refer to:
 San Francisco, Cundinamarca, Colombia
 San Francisco, Putumayo, Colombia
 San Francisco, El Petén, Guatemala
 San Francisco, Atlántida, Honduras
 San Francisco, Lempira, Honduras
 San Francisco, Cebu, Philippines
 San Francisco, Southern Leyte, Philippines
 San Francisco Municipality, Falcón in Falcón, Venezuela
 San Francisco Municipality, Zulia in Zulia, Venezuela

Municipality name disambiguation pages